La Carlota, officially the City of La Carlota,, is a 4th class component city in the province of Negros Occidental, Philippines. According to the 2020 census, it has a population of 66,664 people. making it the least populous city in the province.

Until two years after its foundation in 1871, it was known as Simancas, a barrio under the jurisdiction of the neighboring town of San Enrique, which was led by a Spaniard who was married to a woman named Carlota. Legend has it that she was well-loved by the natives for her social works so that they named their settlement after her when it was created as a municipality near the end of the Spanish colonial era in the Philippines. In line with the Spanish practice of adding an article before a proper noun, “La Carlota” became its official name. On June 19, 1965, by virtue of Republic Act No. 4585, La Carlota was granted a city charter, becoming one of the two landlocked cities in Negros Island, the other being neighbouring Canlaon in Negros Oriental.

In 2011, the Department of the Interior and Local Government (DILG) awarded the city with a "seal of good housekeeping" for its efforts in advancing accountability and transparency in local governance. In the same year, it was also named as one of the top-performing local government units in the Philippines, ranking eighth in the component cities category. On December 29, 2011, the city was nominated for excellence in local governance, an honor given by the provincial government under its Pagpasidungog Awards .

History

Throughout much of its early history, agriculture was the main source of livelihood for the native settlers of Simancas. The original inhabitants grew rice for their own consumption and latter ones cultivated tobacco for export during the Spanish colonial era. Early settlers were drawn to Candaguit River from where Simancas expanded. In 1856 historians began mentioning the village of Mampunay in their accounts of the settlement's history. The local parish priest of San Enrique at the time designated Simancas as a barrio.

Prior to the establishment of the permanent Spanish settlement in the Philippines in 1565, Simancas was led by Mangkas, a negrito warrior. He lived around the area of what is today known as Canman-ug Creek. People looked up to him for his bravery in warding off hostile forces and for keeping the peace. Legend says that because the people revered him, they named their children after him. With many inhabitants named Mangkas, the settlement eventually became known as Simancas.

The Spanish began establishing their administration over the Philippine archipelago since the late 16th century.

The division of Negros island into two distinct provinces (Negros Occidental and Negros Oriental) took place in 1890 at the start of this historic decade. La Carlota as well saw a flowering of culture during this decade, which ushered in what many consider as its golden literary age. Near the end of that decade was born in La Carlota one of its most famous children in the literary field: Adelina Gurrea. She later gained world prominence as a journalist, poet and novelist in Spain where she espoused women's causes in her writings.

From 1901 to 1906, La Carlota figured prominently in the anti-American resistance movement on Negros. It produced some of the best-known Babaylan leaders, chief among whom was Papa Isio. He led the struggle against the American occupation that replaced the Spanish regime as a result of the Treaty of Paris that ended the Spanish–American War and ceded control of the Philippines to the United States. Babaylans  or entrencirados  conducted guerrilla warfare against the American forces in the towns of La Carlota, Isabela, Kabankalan and La Castellana. From its humble beginnings as a small settlement, La Carlota has evolved into one of the major sugar-producing cities in the Philippines.

Geography

La Carlota City is geographically located at the north-central portion of Negros Occidental. It is bordered in the north by Bago, in the east by Kanlaon Volcano and Canlaon of Negros Oriental, in the southeast by the town of La Castellana, in the southwest by Pontevedra and in the west by San Enrique.

Climate

The city enjoys two distinct seasons like the rest of the Philippines: The dry season from January through May and the wet season from June through December.

Barangays

La Carlota City is politically subdivided into 14 barangays, three urban and eleven rural areas.  The urban barangays are Barangay I, Barangay II and Barangay III, which are all situated in the city proper. The farthest from the city is Barangay Yubo, which is 17.9 kilometers from the urban core. The city's barangays are as follows:

Demographics

The first recorded census, conducted in 1903, pegged the population at 3,097. The 1995 Philippine Statistics Authority survey recorded a population of 56,414. Two years later, the population grew to 57,982, increasing to 62,094 in 2002. By then population density was 4.5 persons per hectare.  Of the 14 barangays or villages, Barangay II has the biggest population with 9,221 and Barangay Yubo has the smallest with 1,962.

About 96% of the people use a local Negrense variant of Hiligaynon as their main language of communication, while the remaining 04% of the population use Cebuano. English, and sometimes Filipino, are generally understood and spoken by a large segment of the city's population, especially amongst the well-educated peoples.

Economy

Tourism

Our Lady of Peace and Good Voyage Catholic Church Standing in the heart of La Carlota City on La Paz Street, Barangay I, Poblacion is this old church, built in 1876 during the Spanish era. It has the distinction as one of the very few churches of Romanesque architectural design in the region.

A distinct quality of this church was its use of Silay red bricks and coral stones bonded together by lime mixed in duck eggs as a binder. The materials were taken from Guimaras Island. The church was built by Filipinos forced to work under the polo system during the Spanish regime. The unpopular practice required Filipino males from age 16 to 60 to render free labor constructing churches, roads, bridges and other infrastructure for a total of forty days during the year.

Muscovado Sugar Mill Brick Chimney Ruins This muscovado sugar mill brick chimney at Hacienda Canman-ug, Barangay Batuan was constructed before the establishment of Central Azucarera de La Carlota. It was powered by an A & W Smith Company steam engine manufactured in 1883 in Glasgow. This tourist destination offers a glimpse into the lives of Mangkasanons over a century ago and serves as a vehicle of knowledge on how the sugar industry in this part of the world has evolved.

Iron Dinosaurs of Central Azucarera de La Carlota Visitors entering through the western part of the city are greeted by a black vintage steam locomotive, which the locals have dubbed as the “Iron Dinosaur” of La Carlota.

Infante Heritage House On December 12, 2001, the house was designated by the National Historical Institute as a heritage house, and a historical marker was placed on the property.

Presidencia Building The seat of the local government, constructed in 1934, is a landmark in the city center.

La Granja Agricolas This agricultural model farm was established in 1881 through a Spanish royal decree issued on November 15, 1881, and was formally opened on July 8, 1884. The Philippines government maintains a stock farm in Barangay La Granja as well as a research center established by the Philippine Sugar Commission.

Agora Public Market It was constructed in 1981 to replace the old public market of La Carlota that was destroyed by fire in 1978. It is named after the Greek term "Agora", which stands for a public open space used for assemblies and markets. It is located just a few meters away from the public plaza.

Festivals
 Pasalamat Festival: 
 The Christmas Festival of Lights and Music:

Notable personalities

 Adelina Gurrea - Spanish Philippine poet and journalist.
 Gilbert Luis R. Centina III - Filipino-American novelist and prize-winning poet.
 Pancho Villa - World flyweight champion from 1923 to 1925. 
 Small Montana - World flyweight crown holder from 1935 to 1938. 
 Little Dado (Eleuterio Zapanta) - Boxer from 1938 to 1944.

Sister Cities

 Carson, California, USA

References

External links

La Carlota City Official Website
 [ Philippine Standard Geographic Code]
Philippine Census Information
Local Governance Performance Management System

Cities in Negros Occidental
Populated places established in 1869
1869 establishments in the Philippines
Component cities in the Philippines